Stephen Marlowe (born Milton Lesser,  in Brooklyn, New York, died , in Williamsburg, Virginia) was an American author of science fiction, mystery novels, and fictional autobiographies of Goya, Christopher Columbus, Miguel de Cervantes, and Edgar Allan Poe. He is best known for his detective character Chester Drum, whom he created for the 1955 novel The Second Longest Night. Lesser also wrote using the pseudonyms Adam Chase, Andrew Frazer, C.H. Thames, Jason Ridgway, Stephen Wilder and Ellery Queen.

Biography

Lesser attended the College of William & Mary, earning his degree in philosophy, marrying Leigh Lang soon after graduating. He was drafted into the United States Army during the Korean War. He and his wife divorced during 1962.

He was awarded the French Prix Gutenberg du Livre during 1988 for The Memoirs of Christopher Columbus, and during 1997 he was awarded the "Life Achievement Award" by the Private Eye Writers of America. He also served on the board of directors of the Mystery Writers of America. During the later part of his life he lived with his second wife Ann in Williamsburg, Virginia.

Selected bibliography

As Milton S. Lesser:
 Somewhere I'll Find You (1947)
 Earthbound (1952) 
 The Star Seekers (1953)
 Recruit for Andromeda (1959)
 Stadium Beyond the Stars (1960)
 Spacemen Go Home (1961)
 Secret of the Black Planet (1965)

As Stephen Marlowe:
 Catch the Brass Ring (1954)
 Model for Murder (1955)
 Turn Left for Murder (1955)
 Dead on Arrival (1956)
 Blonde Bait (1959)
 Passport to Peril (1959)
 The Shining (1961)
 Colossus: A novel about Goya and a world gone mad (1965)
 The Search for Bruno Heidler (1966)
 Come Over, Red Rover (1968)
 The Summit (1970)
 The Man with No Shadow (1974)
 The Cawthorn Journals (or Too Many Chiefs) (1975)
 Translation (1976)
 The Valkyrie Encounter (1978)
 Deborah's Legacy (1983)
 The Memoirs of Christopher Columbus (1987)
 The Death and Life of Miguel De Cervantes (1991)
 The Lighthouse at the End of the World (1995)

Chester Drum novels (as Stephen Marlowe):
 The Second Longest Night (1955)
 Mecca for Murder (1956)
 Killers Are My Meat (1957)
 Murder Is My Dish (1957)
 Trouble Is My Name (1957)
 Terror Is My Trade (1958)
 Violence Is My Business (1958)
 Double in Trouble (with Richard S. Prather, co-starring Prather's series character Shell Scott) (1959)
 Homicide Is My Game (1959)
 Danger Is My Line (1960)
 Death Is My Comrade (1960)
 Peril Is My Pay (1960)
 Manhunt Is My Mission (1961)
 Jeopardy Is My Job (1962)
 Francesca (1963)
 Drum Beat - Berlin (1964)
 Drum Beat - Dominique (1965)
 Drum Beat - Madrid (1966)
 Drum Beat - Erica (1967)
 Drum Beat - Marianne (1968)

As Adam Chase (writing with Paul W. Fairman):
 The Golden Ape (1959)

As Andrew Frazer:
 Find Eileen Hardin - Alive! (1959)
 The Fall of Marty Moon (1960)

As Jason Ridgway:  
 West Side Jungle (1958)
 Adam's Fall (1960)
 People in Glass Houses (1961)
 Hardly a Man Is Now Alive (1962)
 The Treasure of the Cosa Nostra (1966)

As Ellery Queen
 Dead Man's Tale (1961)

As C. H. Thames:
 Violence Is Golden (1956)
 Blood of My Brother (1963)

References

External links
 The Mystery*File blog: Bill Pronzini on Stephen Marlowe, 1928-2008.
 
 
 
 
 
 

1928 births
2008 deaths
20th-century American novelists
American male novelists
American mystery writers
American science fiction writers
College of William & Mary alumni
Novelists from Virginia
People from Williamsburg, Virginia
Shamus Award winners
American male short story writers
20th-century American short story writers
20th-century American male writers